Parse Table may refer to table-driven versions of:
 An LR parser using tables derived from a grammar by a parser generator
 An LL parser using tables derived from a grammar